Adolf Ágai (March 31, 1836 – September 16, 1916) was a Hungarian-Jewish writer and journalist.

Biography
Adolf Rosenzweig was born to a Yiddish-speaking Jewish family in Jánoshalma, Hungary. His father, Joseph Rosenzweig, at the age of thirteen, had emigrated from Galicia to Hungary, where he studied medicine, became a physician, and wrote a book on asphyxia, which was ultimately published with the financial aid of the Hungarian politician Gábor Klauzál. He also translated Hungarian literature and poetry into Hebrew, including the Szózat and works by Sándor Petőfi. The family adopted the Hungarian name Ágai in 1848.

Ágai was trained as a physician in Vienna, and afterwards worked at a hospital in Budapest. For this journal and for the  he wrote letters from Vienna (1854–81), and occasionally contributed to the Wanderer, Gartenlaube, and Fliegende Blätter. In 1865, under the pseudonym "Porzó," he wrote a series of spirited feuilletons, remarkable for their pathos and humour.

He abandoned medicine in 1868 to focus on writing and editing. The humorous characters he created were well known in Hungary, especially the Jewish caricature "Seifensteiner Salamon." In that journal he wrote under the pseudonym "Forgó Bácsi." His annual calendars, published under the names of the various humorous characters in his Borsszem Jankó, were widely read. Ágai was a successful lecturer, and has translated German and French books into Hungarian. He was a member of the Kisfaludy Society and also of the Hungarian-Jewish Literary Society.

Selected publications

References
 

1836 births
1916 deaths
19th-century Hungarian Jews
19th-century Hungarian novelists
20th-century Hungarian Jews
20th-century Hungarian novelists
Hungarian editors
Hungarian journalists
Hungarian male novelists
Jewish Hungarian writers
Jewish Hungarian-language writers
Jewish journalists